The following are the telephone codes in Zimbabwe.

Local Calls

In the same town/city 
For calls inside the same geographic numbering area (local calls), dial the Subscriber Number only (this includes the Prefixing Number).

To another town/city 
To make a call from one town or city to another within Zimbabwe, a subscriber should dial the area code (with the preceding zero "0"), followed by the New Added Prefixing Number, and the required subscriber number.

International calls
Zimbabwe was allocated its own country code by the International Telecommunication Union, +263, in the late 1960s, when it was known as Rhodesia.

 To call a Zimbabwean number from  another country: dial: the international access code (i.e. 00 for most European countries, and 011 from North America), followed by the country code (263), followed by the area code, and then the required subscriber number.  Example for calling a subscriber in Harare, Zimbabwe, dail: 00 263 24 2xx xxx (x= subscriber number).  The zero (0) at the beginning of the area code is dropped when calling with the country code (263). Until the 1990s, calls to Zimbabwe could be made from South Africa using the regional code 0194.
 For international calls from Zimbabwe, dial the international Access Prefix "00" followed by the country code and the National Significant Number for the subscriber.  Until 1996, the international access code was 110.

List of Zimbabwe Landline Telephone area codes

Detailed list of area codes

1. Harare

2.  Bulawayo

3. Mashonaland

4. Midlands

5. Manicaland

6. Masvingo

7. Matabeleland

Public Mobile Telecommunication Network Services (Cellphone Service) 
National Subscriber Numbers for Public Mobile Telecommunication Network Services are non-geographic numbers and consists of the National Destination Code and the Subscriber Number.

How to call a Zimbabwe mobile phone number: 

 For local Mobile to Mobile calls or mobile to PSTN /VoIP national calls, the national prefix “0” needs to be dialled first, followed by the complete national destination number. 
 For International Calls, dial the international Access Prefix “00” followed by the country code and the National Number for the subscriber.

Voice over Internet Telephony (VoIP) Services 

 National Subscriber Numbers for VoIP services are non-geographic numbers and consists of the National Destination Code (NDC) and the Subscriber Number (SN).   For VoIP national calls the national prefix “0” needs to be dialled first, followed by the national significant number (NSN). 
 For international Calls, dial the international Access Prefix “00” followed by the country code and the National Significant Number.

Toll Free Numbers 
The following are toll free number allocations for Zimbabwe:

Special Codes and Access Prefixes

References

External links
"Zimbabwe National Numbering Plan" 2012, The Postal and Telecommunications Regulatory Authority of Zimbabwe 

Zimbabwe
Communications in Zimbabwe
Telecommunications in Zimbabwe
Telephone numbers